Wilfred Gisuka Machage (10 August 1956 – 19 February 2022) was a Kenyan politician.

Biography
Machage was first elected as Member of Parliament to represent the Kuria Constituency in 2002. He has served in several government ministries as an assistant minister and was at one time appointed a cabinet minister for East African Community Affairs, Bank accounts held at Kenya Commercial Bank, where he was also an ex-officio member of the East African Legislative Assembly. In 2007 he was the Democratic Party candidate and was elected to represent the Kuria Constituency in the National Assembly of Kenya in the December 2007 parliamentary election. He has also  served as Assistant Minister of Home Affairs' Office of Vice President, Office of the President, Health, and Roads. Machage was elected as the first senator of Migori county in 2012 to 2017. He was a businessman with interests in different sectors globally. He was appointed Ambassador by H.E. Uhuru Kenyatta on 27 January 2018. Machage was the Kenyan high commissioner to Nigeria and accredited to 12 other countries in central and west Africa. He died in Abuja on 19 February 2022, at the age of 65.

References

1956 births
2022 deaths
Members of the Senate of Kenya
Democratic Party (Kenya) politicians
Members of the National Assembly (Kenya)
University of Nairobi alumni
People from Migori County